BRP Federico Martir (PC-385) is fourteenth ship of the  coastal patrol craft of the Philippine Navy. It is part of the second batch of its class ordered through US Foreign Military Sales (FMS) in 1993, and was commissioned with the Philippine Navy on 22 May 1996. She is currently in active service with the Littoral Combat Force, Philippine Fleet.

t was initially designated as Fast Patrol Craft, and was numbered "DF-385", but later on was re-designated as a Patrol Gunboat, and was finally re-numbered as "PG-385". Another round of reclassification was made in April 2016, which re-designated the patrol gunboat as the coastal patrol craft "PC-385".

History 
In 1989, the Philippines placed an order of 4 fast patrol craft with Trinity-Equitable (formerly Halter-Marine Equitable) for USD 9.4 million. The first of the four vessels, arrived on August 20, 1990, was named . The lead ship of the class was named after Jose Andrada, who was one of the original officers of the Offshore Patrol of the Philippine Commonwealth government. In April 1990, the Philippines ordered an additional ship and 3 more ships in August 1990. In March 1993, eleven more vessels were ordered. A total of 22 ships were acquired by the Philippine Navy by 1999.

Ship Design 
Her class was built to U.S. Coast Guard standards, with an aluminium hull and superstructure. In addition, a 4-meter rigid inflatable boat powered by a 40-hp outboard motor is stowed amidships. She has a complement of 12. The ship is equipped with a Raytheon AN/SPS-64(V)11 Navigation/Surface Search Radar, but with a smaller antenna as those used in bigger Philippine Navy ships. Like all other Philippine Navy ships, the entire class was installed with the Philippine Navy Vessel Tracking System (VTS) by the Naval Sea Systems Command.

Armament 
The ships of her class are armed with one 25mm Bushmaster chain gun on Mk.38 Mod.0 mount on second and later batches (PG-379 to PG-395), four M2HB Browning 12.7 mm/50 caliber machine guns on Mk.26 mounts, with two positioned forward and two aft; and two M60 7.62 mm/30 caliber machine guns, both mounted amidships. The ship can carry 4,000 rounds of 12.7 mm and 2,000 rounds of 7.62 mm ammunition. A large "Big Eyes" binocular is also carried on tripod mounts, one on the forecastle and one just abaft the mast.

Propulsion 

Operational history 
In March 2018, the BRP Martir rescued 20 passengers of the motor boat Queen Cleopatra northeast off Miniloc Island in Palawan while on a routine patrol. The Queen Cleopatra suffered engine trouble but was fortunate enough to be along the patrol craft's route. Her passengers were evacuated and she was towed towards the shoreline.

In May 2019, the ship participated in a Search and Rescue Exercise (SAREX) with the JS Samidare (DD-106) Destroyer of the Japan Maritime Self Defense Force (JMSDF) off the coast of Eastern Palawan. The exercise's aim was to expand information sharing, improve interoperability and gain work experience between the two navies.

References 

1990s ships
Ships of the Philippine Navy